Sketches from Bamboo is an album by saxophonist Roscoe Mitchell. It was recorded in June 1979 at Palm Studio in Paris, and was released on LP later that year by Moers Music. On the album, Mitchell is joined by members of a large ensemble known as the Roscoe Mitchell Creative Orchestra.

Reception

In a review for AllMusic, Brian Olewnick wrote that Mitchell "splits the date between two of his notable predilections: the abstract and the funky. The former is represented in the two variations on the title theme that utilize the horns to develop spare, pointillistic patterns that emerge into and then escape out of drone-like textures... Both are fairly successful ventures into structurally balancing composition and improvisation for a large group... 'Linefine Lyon Seven' is... good, ragged fun with the composer up front on alto... Sketches from Bamboo is worth seeking out for the Mitchell fan, although newcomers can gain easier access elsewhere."

The authors of the Penguin Guide to Jazz Recordings stated: "The first 'Sketches' is a compelling, slowly collecting composite of horn lines and the second seeks to amplify that tendency into what is, at the end, a vast, swirling collage that is nevertheless very precisely directed and sustained... for the vividness of the first two tracks, this is well worth having."

Track listing
Composed by Roscoe Mitchell.

Side A
 "Sketches From Bamboo - Cyp I" – 13:17
 "Linefinelyon Seven" – 10:15

Side B
 "Sketches From Bamboo - Cyp II" – 13:49

Personnel 
 Roscoe Mitchell – alto saxophone
 Anthony Braxton – reeds
 Douglas Ewart – reeds
 Wallace McMillan – reeds
 Dwight Andrews – reeds
 Marty Ehrlich – reeds
 Leo Smith – trumpet
 Kenny Wheeler – trumpet
 Hugh Ragin – trumpet
 Mike Mossman – trumpet
 Rob Howard – trumpet
 George Lewis – trombone
 Ray Anderson – trombone
 Alfred Patterson – trombone
 Pinguin Moschner – tuba
 Marilyn Crispell – piano
 Bobby Naughton – vibraphone
 Wes Brown – bass
 Pheeroan akLaff – drums, percussion

References

1979 albums
Roscoe Mitchell albums
Moers Music albums